The 1965 Copa de Confraternidad Iberoamericana was the second and last edition of the Copa Confraternidad Iberoamericana, a friendly international tournament organised by Argentine club River Plate. It was held in Buenos Aires in August 1965.

Four clubs took part in the competition, River Plate and Boca Juniors of Argentina, Santos and Real Madrid, which were touring the Americas. Played under a single-elimination format, Santos won the cup after beating River Plate in the final.

Teams

Bracket

Results

First round

Third place

Final 

{| style="width:100%" class="wikitable collapsible collapsed"
|-
|

Notes

Champion

Performance by club

References 

1965 in Argentine football
Club Atlético River Plate matches
Santos FC matches
Football in Buenos Aires